George Washington Carver School District was a majority-black school district in Royal Oak Township, Michigan.

It separated from the Clinton School District in 1945 as more African-Americans moved to the area. In 1960 Governor of Michigan G. Mennen Williams consolidated the Carver School District, along with its elementary school, into the Oak Park School District because the Carver district no longer had sufficient taxes to pay for a senior high school services, and no area school districts voluntarily took its students for high school. In 1959 Detroit Public Schools (DPS) stopped accepting high school students from Carver because Carver owed DPS $125,053.67 ($ according to inflation) in tuition and because DPS's own schools became overcrowded. At the time 24 teenagers at the 9th grade level resided in the Carver district.

References

Former school districts in Michigan
1945 establishments in Michigan
School districts established in 1945
1960 disestablishments in Michigan
School districts disestablished in 1960
Education in Oakland County, Michigan